In mathematics, the Konhauser polynomials, introduced by , are biorthogonal polynomials for the distribution function of the Laguerre polynomials.

References

Orthogonal polynomials